Adalberto Maria Merli (born 14 January 1938) is an Italian actor and voice actor.

Biography
Born in Rome, Merli is active on film and television and he has appeared in over 27 films since 1965. He had his breakout role in the 1968 RAI television series La freccia nera. After some further television success through the TV series Le terre di Sacramento and E le stelle stanno a guardare Merli made his film debut in the 1971 Miklós Jancsó's drama film La tecnica e il rito, then he became quite active in films of "poliziottesco" or political genre, often in leading roles.

Merli is also active as a voice actor. He is known for having dubbed over the voices of Clint Eastwood, Ed Harris, Robert Redford, Jack Nicholson, David Carradine, Brian Cox, Malcolm McDowell and Michael Caine in some of their films. In his Italian dubbed animation roles, he voiced James P. Sullivan in Monsters, Inc., Mr. Incredible in The Incredibles, The Spirit of the West in Rango, and Pacha in The Emperor's New Groove.

Filmography
 Roma (1972) - Narrator (voice, uncredited)
 The Hassled Hooker (1972) - Claudio Santini
 La prima notte di quiete (1972) - Gerardo Favani
 Black Holiday (1973) - Franco Rossini
 Flatfoot (1973) - Police Commissioner Tabassi
 Processo per direttissima (1974) - Brigadiere Pendicò
 La femme aux bottes rouges (1974) - Man
 Peur sur la ville (1975) - Pierre Valdeck / Minos
 Faccia di spia (1975) - Captain Felix Ramos
 Le Gang (1977) - Manu
 Per questa notte (1977) - Ossorio
 Sciopèn (1982) - Andrea Serano
 Cento giorni a Palermo (1984) - Mafioso
 Let's Hope It's a Girl (1986) - Cesare Molteni (uncredited)
 L'orchestre rouge (1989) - Berg
 Duel of Hearts (1991, TV Movie) - Grimaldi
 State Secret (1995) - Ermes Ravida
 Stupor mundi (1997) - The Pope
 The Dinner (1998) - Bricco
 Crimine contro crimine (1998) - Monzi
 The Card Player (2004) - Police Commissioner

Dubbing roles

Animation 
 Pacha in The Emperor's New Groove
 James P. Sullivan in Monsters, Inc.
 James P. Sullivan in Mike's New Car
 Bob Parr / Mr. Incredible in The Incredibles
 Sulley Car in Cars
 Spirit of the West in Rango

Live action
 Frankie Dunn in Million Dollar Baby
 Agamemnon in Troy
Randle Patrick McMurphy in One Flew Over the Cuckoo's Nest
Christof in The Truman Show
Eric "Rick" Masters in To Live and Die in L.A.
The Big Man in Dogville
Alex DeLarge in A Clockwork Orange
Bill in Kill Bill: Volume 1
Bill in Kill Bill: Volume 2
Dušan Gavrić in The Peacemaker
Jonathan Lansdale in The Hand
Allan Quatermain in The League of Extraordinary Gentlemen
Mark Hunter in Beyond a Reasonable Doubt
Ed Crane in The Man Who Wasn't There
Lieutenant Riker in The Secret of the Sahara
Sam Quint in Black Moon Rising
Stephen Malley in Lions for Lambs
Harman Sullivan in Charley Varrick
Jack Sclavino in Live Free or Die Hard
Harry Bailey in Getting Straight
Veteran Gangster in Gangster No. 1
Sam Lawson in Too Late the Hero
Thomas Fowler in The Quiet American
Joaquin Manero in The Morning After

Video games
Bob Parr / Mr. Incredible in The Incredibles
Bob Parr / Mr. Incredible in The Incredibles: Rise of the Underminer

References

External links 

 
 

1938 births
Living people
Italian male film actors
Italian male voice actors
Italian male stage actors
Italian male television actors
Italian male video game actors
Male actors from Rome
Nastro d'Argento winners
20th-century Italian male actors
21st-century Italian male actors